Radio Center may refer to:

 Radio Center (Slovenia), a national commercial radio station in Slovenia
 Radiocentre, the industry body for UK commercial radio